ProgrammableWeb was an information and news source about the Web as a programmable platform. It is a subsidiary of MuleSoft and has offices in San Francisco, CA. The website publishes a repository of web APIs, mashups, and applications, and has documented over 19,000 open web APIs and thousands of applications. It has been called the "journal of the API economy" by TechCrunch.

History 
ProgrammableWeb was founded in 2005 by John Musser and had documented 1,000 APIs by November 2008.
 
In June 2010, Alcatel-Lucent acquired ProgrammableWeb as part of a move by the company to align themselves closer to the developer community. Alcatel-Lucent was looking to integrate ProgrammableWeb’s API monitoring services and other API related technologies with its own Open API Service and Developer Platform to strengthen its relationship with developers. During ProgrammableWeb’s time with Alcatel-Lucent, they documented over 8,000 APIs.
 
Three years later on April 13, 2013, MuleSoft announced the acquisition of ProgrammableWeb to "become the go-to destination for APIs and Integration”.

On February 3, 2023 Mulesoft announced that after 17 years in operation, it had shut down Programmable Web.

Content 
ProgrammableWeb.com has two major sections:

 API Directory and Technology Listings: A massive searchable directory of over 15,500 web APIs that are updated daily as well as listings of various mashups, applications, frameworks, libraries, and SDKs.
 News, Analysis, and Reviews:  Daily news on web technology, APIs, and other relevant web information as well as analysis of current trends and reviews of various web technologies.

References

External links
 

American technology news websites
Mobile software development
Web directories
2010 mergers and acquisitions
2013 mergers and acquisitions